Labille is a surname.

List of people with the surname 

 Adélaïde Labille-Guiard (1749–1803), French miniaturist and portrait painter
 Grégory Labille (born 1968), French politician

See also 

 Labelle
 Labill (disambiguation)

French-language surnames
Surnames of French origin